Private Waters in the Great Divide is the seventh studio album by the American musical group Kid Creole and the Coconuts, released in 1990. It includes the singles "The Sex of It" and "I Love Girls".

Production
The album was the band's first for Columbia Records. Always more popular in Europe, Kid Creole's August Darnell was asked by the label to try to create an album that would appeal to the American market. After an estrangement, Darnell had started speaking to his brother and former Dr. Buzzard's Original Savannah Band's bandmate, Stony Browder, during the recording of the album, and asked him to play keyboards. Prince wrote "The Sex of It", the demo tape of which he mailed to Darnell; the two did not collaborate in person. Coati Mundi had left the band by the time production began.

Critical reception
Trouser Press wrote: "Showing tons more imagination and inspiration, Darnell bounced back [from I, Too, Have Seen the Woods] to full artistic strength with the marvelously entertaining Private Waters in the Great Divide, a diverse party of singular wit and intelligence." The Edmonton Journal called Private Waters in the Great Divide "an album that captures everything worthwhile and unique about [Darnell's] hard-working funk band."

Track listing

Charts

References

1990 albums
Kid Creole and the Coconuts albums
Columbia Records albums